June Vincent (born Dorothy June Smith, July 17, 1920 – November 20, 2008) was an American actress.

Life and career
Vincent was born in Harrod, Ohio, the daughter of Sybil Irwin and the Rev. Willis E. Smith.

Stage
Vincent's acting career began in Keene, New Hampshire, where she acted in summer theater. A newspaper article published July 7, 1944, reported, "she was urged to go to Hollywood by talent scouts. Universal promptly signed her." (A different version of Vincent's going to Hollywood appears in the book Ladies of the Western: Interviews with Fifty-One More Actresses from the Silent Era to the Television Westerns of the 1950s and 1960s. Michael G. Fitzgerald and Boyd Magers quote Vincent's recollection, "I was a model – someone saw my picture – and I landed a stock contract at Universal.")

She returned to the stage in 1957, appearing in The Man on a Stick at the Pasadena Playhouse.

Film and television
Vincent began her career in film in the early 1940s. After having made 50 films, she retired from that field when her second child was born.

She later became a successful television actress appearing in many programs throughout the 1950s, 1960s, and 1970s. She appeared in three episodes of Have Gun - Will Travel and she made five guest appearances on Perry Mason including the roles of murderer Madge Wainwright in the 1959 episode, "The Case of the Bartered Bikini," and title character and murder victim/villainess Laura Randall in the 1961 episode, "The Case of the Wintry Wife."

Personal life
Vincent was married to William M. Sterling in 1940 by Vincent's father, Reverend Willis E. Smith. They had a son, William Thayer Sterling, and a daughter, Tina Sterling. Their third child was singer songwriter Mindy Sterling (not to be confused with actress Mindy Sterling).

A Republican, Vincent supported Dwight Eisenhower's campaign during the 1952 presidential election. Like her parents, Vincent was a Congregationalist.

Death
Vincent died on November 20, 2008, in Aurora, Colorado.

Filmography

References

External links

 
 

1920 births
2008 deaths
Actresses from Ohio
American film actresses
American television actresses
American stage actresses
People from Harrod, Ohio
Actresses from Los Angeles
20th-century American memoirists
20th-century American actresses
Western (genre) film actresses
Western (genre) television actors
American female models
California Republicans
Colorado Republicans
Ohio Republicans
American Congregationalists
American women memoirists
21st-century memoirists
21st-century American women